is the 16th single by Japanese singer/songwriter Chisato Moritaka. The lyrics were written by Moritaka and the music was composed by Hideo Saitō. The single was released by Warner Music Japan on June 25, 1992.

Background 
Moritaka wrote "Watashi ga Obasan ni Natte mo" when she was 20 after being told by male staff of her management that women reach their prime at age 19. The song describes a woman's wish for a man to accept her, regardless of her age. It partially draws inspiration from The Beatles' "When I'm Sixty-Four".

The song was used as the opening theme of the NTV drama series . Moritaka wrote the lyrics for the B-side , based on her experiences commuting to school by bicycle.

Music video 
No music video of the song was made at the time the single was released, but in 2001, a re-edit of the song performance from Moritaka's 1993 live video Live Rock Alive was included as a music video in the DVD Chisato Moritaka DVD Collection No. 15, which was a mail-in order exclusive for those who purchased the first edition release of DVD Collection Nos. 1-14. On June 25, 2022, Warner Music Japan uploaded a remastered version of the music video on Apple Music to commemorate the 30th anniversary of the single.

Chart performance and reception 
"Watashi ga Obasan ni Natte mo" peaked at No. 15 on Oricon's singles chart and sold 228,000 copies, and has since become one of Moritaka's most popular songs. It was also certified Gold by the RIAJ in December 1992.

In his 2019 article, music journalist and blogger Tomonori Shiba noted that the song symbolized a shift in women's attitudes during the Heisei era.

Other versions 
Moritaka's 2013 live album YouTube Public Recording & Live at Yokohama Blitz features , with the lyrics of this song performed to the tune of her 1990 song "Aru OL no Seishun ~ A-ko no Baai ~ (Moritaka Connection)".

The song was remixed by tofubeats in the 2014 collaboration album Chisato Moritaka with tofubeats: Moritaka Tofu.

In 2015, Moritaka re-recorded the song for a series of Kosé cosmetics commercials she starred in. This version, titled  was included in her 2017 self-covers DVD album Love Vol. 10.

In 2019, she performed a brief a cappella version of the song in a commercial promoting DHC Queen of Serum anti-aging skin cream.

Track listing

Personnel 
 Chisato Moritaka – vocals
 Hideo Saitō – all instruments, programming, backing vocals

Chart positions

Certification

Cover versions 
 McKee covered the song in Tagalog as "Hindi Kaya" on their 1996 self-titled album.
 Runa Miyoshida covered the song on her 2008 album Ska Flavor #1.
 navy&ivory covered the song on their 2009 album Nakeru hodo Suki na Hito.
 Misono covered the song on her 2010 album Cover Album 2.
 Nozomi Tsuji covered the song on her 2010 album Minna Happy! Mama no Uta.
 Yūko Minaguchi covered the song for the 2011 LovePlus soundtrack.
 Mitsu covered the song on their 2012 single "Hatsukoi Capsule" and cover album Mitsukari.
 You Kikkawa covered the song as the B-side of her 2012 single "Darling and Madonna" and her cover album Vocalist?.
 Saya Asakura covered the song on her 2014 album Hōgen Kakumei, with the lyrics changed to Yamagata-ben.
 Konomi Suzuki covered the song on her 2015 album 18 -Colorful Gift-.
 Michiru Hoshino covered the song on her 2016 album My Favorite Song.
 Tsubaki Factory covered the song as the B-side of their 2016 single "Hitorijime".
 Maria Satō of Philosophy no Dance covered the song as part of the group's "Tiny Bath Concert" video series in 2021.

References

External links 
 
 
 

1992 singles
1992 songs
Japanese-language songs
Japanese television drama theme songs
Chisato Moritaka songs
Songs with feminist themes
Songs with lyrics by Chisato Moritaka
Songs with music by Hideo Saitō (musician, born 1958)
Warner Music Japan singles